True-believer syndrome is an informal or rhetorical term used by M. Lamar Keene in his 1976 book The Psychic Mafia. Keene coined the term in that book. He used the term to refer to people who continued to believe in a paranormal event or phenomenon even after it had been proven to have been staged. Keene considered it to be a cognitive disorder, and regarded it as being a key factor in the success of many psychic mediums.

The term "true believer" was used earlier by Eric Hoffer in his 1951 book The True Believer to describe the psychological roots of fanatical groups.

True-believer syndrome could be considered a type of belief perseverance for paranormal phenomena.

Psychology
In an article published in Skeptical Inquirer, psychologist Matthew J. Sharps and his colleagues analyze and dissect the psychology of True Believers and their behavior after the predicted apocalypse fails to happen.  Using the 2012 Mayan apocalypse prophecy as an example, and citing several other similar cases, Sharps contributes four psychological factors that compel these people to continue their belief (or even stronger belief) despite the conflicted reality.
 Subclinical dissociative tendencies: While not suffering from mental illness, people with subclinical dissociative tendencies have a higher inclination to experience disconnection with immediate physical reality and propensity to see highly improbable things with enhanced credulity.  Such subclinical dissociation is usually associated with paranormal thinking.
 Cognitive dissonance: The more one invests in a belief, the more value one will place in this belief and, as a  consequence, be more resistant to facts, evidence or reality that contradict this belief.  Some of the True Believers in the Keech case in the example below had left their spouses, jobs and given up their possessions to prepare to board the alien spacecraft.  When the world did not end, cognitive dissonance-reducing activity (belief disconfirmation response) provided an enhancement of their beliefs and outlet for their heavy investment and discomfort in front of reality.
 Gestalt processing: In the continuum in human information processing, people with Gestalt processing will consider a concept without detailed analysis (as opposed to feature-intensive thinking) and accept the idea as a whole relatively uncritically.  Sharps suggests a relationship between dissociative tendencies and gestalt processing.   People who incline to believe paranormal activities will be more likely to credulously entertain the ancient Mayan prophecies whose details most people know little about.
 Availability heuristic: Under the mental shortcut of availability heuristic, people place more importance and give more weight to a belief when examples related to the idea are more readily recalled, most often because they are recent information and latest news.  The information of Mayan prophecies has been abundantly available, especially in the media, before the expected apocalyptic date.  People's judgments tend to bias toward this latest news, particularly those with dissociative tendency toward supernatural and favor gestalt processing.

Examples

M. Lamar Keene and "Raoul"
In his book The Psychic Mafia, Keene told of his partner, a psychic medium named "Raoul". Some in their congregation still believed that Raoul was genuine, even after Keene openly admitted that he was a fake. Keene wrote "I knew how easy it was to make people believe a lie, but I didn't expect the same people, confronted with the lie, would choose it over the truth. ... No amount of logic can shatter a faith consciously based on a lie."

José Alvarez and "Carlos"
According to The Skeptic's Dictionary, an example of this syndrome is evidenced by an event in 1988 when stage magician James Randi, at the request of an Australian news program, coached stage performer José Alvarez to pretend he was channelling a two-thousand-year-old spirit named "Carlos". Even after it was revealed to be a fictional character created by Randi and Alvarez, many people continued to believe that "Carlos" was real. Randi commented: "no amount of evidence, no matter how good it is or how much there is of it, is ever going to convince the true believer to the contrary."

Marian Keech and "Clarion"
In the book When Prophecy Fails, Festinger and his colleagues observed a fringe group led by "Marian Keech" (researchers' pseudonym) who believed that the world would be destroyed on December 21, 1954, and the true believers would be rescued by aliens on a spaceship to a fictional planet, Clarion.  When nothing happened, the group believed that their devotion convinced God to spare the world and they became even more feverish in proselytizing their belief.   This is one of the first cases that led Festinger to form the theory of cognitive dissonance.

Harold Camping's 2011 end times prediction

American Christian radio host Harold Camping claimed that the Rapture and Judgment Day would take place on May 21, 2011, and that the end of the world would take place five months later on October 21, 2011, based on adding the 153 fish of John 20 to May 21. Camping, who was then president of the Family Radio Christian network, claimed the Bible as his source and said May 21 would be the date of the Rapture and the day of judgment "beyond the shadow of a doubt". Camping suggested that it would occur at 6 pm local time, with the Rapture sweeping the globe time zone by time zone, while some of his supporters claimed that around 200 million people (approximately 3% of the world's population) would be "raptured". Camping had previously claimed that the Rapture would occur in September 1994. Following the failure of the prediction, media attention shifted to the response from Camping and his followers. On May 23, Camping amended that May 21 had been a "spiritual" day of judgment, and that the physical Rapture would occur on October 21, 2011, simultaneously with the destruction of the universe by God. However, on October 16, Camping admitted to an interviewer that he did not know when the end would come.

See also

References

Notes

Bibliography
 Keene, M. Lamar and Spraggett, Allen (1997) The Psychic Mafia, Prometheus Books,

Further reading
 Hall, Harriet A., (2006). "Teaching Pigs to Sing: An Experiment in Bringing Critical Thinking to the Masses", Skeptical Inquirer, Vol 30, #3, May/June 2006, pp. 36–39
 Lalich, Janja. Bounded Choice: True Believers and Charismatic Cults. University of California Press, 2004. 
 Raymo, Chet. Skeptics and True Believers: The Exhilarating Connection Between Science and Religion. Walker Publishing, 1998. 
 Singer, Barry and Benassi, Victor A., (1980). "Fooling Some of the People All of the Time", Skeptical Inquirer, Vol 5, #2, Winter 1980/81, pp. 17–24

Barriers to critical thinking
Belief
Cognitive inertia
Paranormal